Craterellus excelsus is a species of fungus in the family Cantharellaceae. Reported as a new species in 2009, it was originally collected from the Pakaraima Mountains of Guyana. The species is found in rainforests that are composed predominantly of Dicymbe species.

References

Cantharellales
Fungi described in 2009
Fungi of Guyana